Yuriy Anatoliyovych Sergeyev  (5 February 1956, Leninakan, Armenia) is a former Ukrainian diplomat and politician, who has served as Ambassador Extraordinary and Plenipotentiary of Ukraine, and Permanent Representative of Ukraine to the United Nations.

Early life and education 
Born on February 5, 1956, in Leninakan (Armenia), Sergeyev graduated from Taras Shevchenko National University of Kyiv, Ph.D. (1981). He was later a Senior Fellow as well as a Lecturer in EU Studies and Political Science at Yale University (2016-2020). He is fluent in English, Russian and French.

Professional career and experience 

 1981–1992 — Assistant, Docent at the Philological Faculty of Taras Shevchenko National University of Kyiv, Deputy Director of the Institute of Ukrainian Studies.
 April 1992 — September 1993 — Director, Press Service of the Ministry of Foreign Affairs of Ukraine.
 August — December 1994 — Director, Secretariat of the Minister for Foreign Affairs of Ukraine.
 December 1994 — January 1997; September 1993 — August 1994 — Director, Directorate for Information of the Ministry of Foreign Affairs of Ukraine.
 January — November 1997 — Counselor-Envoy for the Embassy of Ukraine to the United Kingdom of Great Britain and Northern Ireland.
 November 1997 — December 2000 — Ambassador Extraordinary and Plenipotentiary of Ukraine to Greece and Albania (with the residence in Athens).
 December 2000 — February 2001 — Director-General, Directorate-General for Foreign Policy of the Administration of the President of Ukraine.
 February — July 2001 — Deputy Minister for Foreign Affairs of Ukraine.
 July 2001 — March 2003 — Secretary of State of the Ministry of Foreign Affairs of Ukraine.
 March 2003 — April 2007 — Ambassador Extraordinary and Plenipotentiary of Ukraine to France, Permanent Representative of Ukraine to UNESCO.
 April 2007 — present Permanent Representative of Ukraine to the United Nations
 2008 — present Ambassador Extraordinary and Plenipotentiary of Ukraine to Commonwealth of the Bahamas (with the residence in New York City)
 2008 — elected member of the United Nations Human Rights Council
 September 2012 — elected Chair of the Sixth Committee (Legal and Administrative) at the United Nations
 2015 —  non-permanent member to the United Nations Security Council
 On 9 December 2015 Volodymyr Yelchenko replaced Sergeyev as permanent Representative of Ukraine to the United Nations. Early February 2016 Sergeyev announced the end of his diplomatic career.

Awards and decorations 
 April 2003 The State "Order of Merit" of Ukraine
 Honorary Decree of the Ministry of Foreign Affairs of Ukraine

Diplomatic rank 
 Ambassador Extraordinary and Plenipotentiary of Ukraine.

References

External links 
 Permanent Mission of Ukraine to the United Nations
 UPDATE 5-Ukraine's U.N. envoy: 'We are strong enough to defend ourselves'
 Юрий Сергеев, Посол Украины в ООН в телепередаче "У нас в Америке"-1
 

1956 births
Living people
People from Gyumri
Kiev Military College of Frunze alumni
Taras Shevchenko National University of Kyiv alumni
Academic staff of the Taras Shevchenko National University of Kyiv
Ambassadors of Ukraine to France
Ambassadors of Ukraine to Greece
Ambassadors of Ukraine to Albania
Ambassadors of Ukraine to the Bahamas
Permanent Representatives of Ukraine to the United Nations
Ukrainian philologists
Armenian people of Russian descent
Russians in Ukraine
Armenian emigrants to Ukraine